Venting is the debut album and sole studio album by the nu metal music group Five.Bolt.Main. It was released on September 13, 2005 via Rock Ridge Music. Three singles were released from the album: "Pathetic" (2005), "The Gift" (2006), and "Seem to Be Fine" (2006). Venting sold roughly around 20,000 copies.

Track listing
 "The Gift" – 2:50
 "Pathetic" – 4:08
 "Wait in Line" – 3:34
 "Broken Compass" – 3:53
 "What You Are" – 3:39
 "Slip" – 3:56
 "Breathing" – 3:30
 "Seem to Be Fine" – 4:10
 "Life of Mine" – 3:26
 "Descending" – 3:47
 "Made Like This" – 3:31
 "Bid Farewell" – 3:30

Personnel
The following lineup featured on Venting – and was the original lineup for Five.Bolt.Main.
 Chris Volz – vocals
 Aaron Welenken – guitar
 Jason Chandler – guitar
 Ben Patrick – bass
 Ivan Arnold – drums

In media
 In 2009, Five.Bolt.Main's song "The Gift" was used as the official song of "PWO Wrestlelution 2: A Coming of Age," a wrestling event that aired on "Pro Wrestling Ohio" TV in the state of Ohio.

Music videos
 "Pathetic" (2005)
 "The Gift" (2006)

References

Rock Ridge Music albums
2005 debut albums
Five.Bolt.Main albums